Calvert High School is a public high school located in the city of Calvert, Texas, USA and classified as a 1A school by the UIL.  It is a part of the Calvert Independent School District located in southeastern Robertson County.   In 2015, the school was rated "Improvement Required" by the Texas Education Agency.

Athletics
The Calvert Trojans compete in these sports - 

Volleyball, Cross Country, 6-Man Football, Basketball & Track

State Titles
Boys Basketball - 
2012(1A/D2)
Football - 
2002(6M)
Boys Track - 
1992(1A)

State Finalist
Girls Basketball - 
2014(1A/D2)

References

External links
 Calvert ISD website

Schools in Robertson County, Texas
Public high schools in Texas